Jack Johnson (born 1 July 1999) is an English professional rugby league footballer who plays as a  or on the  for Newcastle Thunder in the RFL Championship. 

He previously played for the Warrington Wolves in the Super League, and spent time on loan from Warrington at the Rochdale Hornets in League 1 and the Championship. Johnson also spent time on loan from the Wolves at Widnes in the Betfred Super League, and joined Featherstone Rovers towards the end of the 2019 Championship season.

Background
Johnson was born in Audenshaw, Manchester, England.

Career

Warrington Wolves
Johnson made his début for the Warrington Wolves in the Super League match against Hull F.C. on 6 September 2015.

Widnes Vikings
On 19 August 2020 it was announced that Johnson would be leaving Widnes at the end of the 2020 season.

Newcastle Thunder
On 26 Nov 2020 it was reported that he had signed for Newcastle Thunder in the RFL Championship.

References

External links
Warrington Wolves profile
SL profile

1996 births
Living people
English rugby league players
Featherstone Rovers players
Newcastle Thunder players
Rochdale Hornets players
Rugby league fullbacks
Rugby league players from Manchester
Rugby league wingers
Warrington Wolves players
Widnes Vikings players